Poeppigia is a genus of flowering plants in the family Fabaceae. It belongs to the subfamily Dialioideae. It contains a single species, Poeppigia procera.

References

Dialioideae
Monotypic Fabaceae genera